Below are the squads for the Football at the 2013 Southeast Asian Games – men's tournament, hosted by Myanmar, which took place between 7 and 21 December 2013.

Group A

Malaysia 
Head coach:  Ong Kim Swee

Vietnam 
Head coach:  Hoàng Văn Phúc

Singapore 
Head coach:  Aide Iskandar

Laos 
Head coach:  Kokichi Kimura

Brunei 
Head coach:  Kwon Oh-Son

Group B

Indonesia 
Head coach:  Rahmad Darmawan

Myanmar 
Head coach:  Park Seong-Hwa

Timor-Leste 
Head coach:  Emerson Alcântara

Thailand 
Head coach:  Kiatisuk Senamuang

Cambodia 
Head coach:  Lee Tae-Hoon

References 

Football at the 2013 Southeast Asian Games